Tele-X was the first communications satellite serving the Nordic countries. It was launched with an Ariane 2 launch vehicle from Kourou, French Guiana, on 2 April 1989. On 16 January 1998, its fuel was exhausted and it was moved into graveyard orbit. The project was managed and operated by the Swedish Space Corporation (SCC), but it was built by Aérospatiale and Saab Ericsson Space, based on the Spacebus 300 series.

Some of the TV channels it broadcast was TV4 Sweden, Kanal 5 Sweden, NRK and Filmnet. In addition, it broadcast radio for TT, The Voice Danmark, Radio Sweden, Rix FM, Mix Megapol and NRJ. It was also used for Internet communication for universities in Eastern Europe.

References

External links 
 Tele-X

Space programme of Sweden
Communications satellites in geostationary orbit
Spacecraft launched in 1989
Satellites using the Spacebus bus
1980s establishments in French Guiana